Edward H. Salmon (born September 16, 1942) is an American politician who served in the New Jersey General Assembly from the 1st Legislative District from 1988 to 1991.

Born in York, Pennsylvania, he attended Gettysburg College graduating in 1964, earned a masters degree from Glassboro State College in 1971, and also attended the University of Delaware. He was a teacher, served as mayor of Millville, and served on the Cumberland County Board of Chosen Freeholders prior to his election to the Legislature in 1987.

Salmon was reelected in 1989 and served in the Assembly until April 1991 when he was appointed to the New Jersey Board of Public Utilities by Governor James Florio.

References

External links
Dr. Edward H. Salmon biography - Salmon Ventures

1942 births
Living people
County commissioners in New Jersey
Democratic Party members of the New Jersey General Assembly
Politicians from Cumberland County, New Jersey
Politicians from York, Pennsylvania
People from Millville, New Jersey
Gettysburg College alumni
Rowan University alumni
University of Delaware alumni